Hillwood Academic Day is a small, independent school for boys and girls in the kindergarten through the eighth grade. The non-denominational school is located at 2521 Scott Street in San Francisco's Pacific Heights neighborhood. It was started in 1949 by Mary Libra and includes a summertime outdoor education program with a lodge in Muir Woods. Eric Grantz, the grandson of Libra and a Hillwood graduate, now runs the school, which has approximately 48 students. Hillwood's mascot is a black labrador retriever, named Max, and the school's colors are forest green and blue. The student publication is The Hillwood Herald, a blog published by the fifth through eighth graders.

History

Hillwood Academic Day School is included in the historical picture book San Francisco's Pacific Heights and Presidio Heights by Tricia O'Brien.

Campus

Hillwood Academic Day School is located inside of a three-story Victorian home in the Pacific Heights neighborhood of San Francisco.

Extracurricular activities
Throughout the school year, students participate in a variety of activities after the school day. While the school does not offer organized sports teams, students regularly play basketball and dodgeball.

References

External links
 

Education in San Francisco
Educational institutions established in 1949
Private middle schools in California
Private elementary schools in California
1949 establishments in California